Bernard Hackett (7 September 1933 - 21 May 2022) was an English former professional footballer, builder and Black Country poet. He played in The Football League for Chester in the 1950s.

Playing career
Although born in Ramsbottom, Hackett grew up in the West Midlands. As a youngster he represented Worcestershire at county level and Birmingham City's junior side before joining Aston Villa. He turned professional in 1953 but left two years later without making a league appearance.

Hackett was one of several forwards to sign for Chester in the summer of 1955, as manager Louis Page also purchased Charlie Jolley, George Allman, Jack Haines, Jim Collins and Frank Wayman. The competition for places and a knee injury meant Hackett was not a regular in the side and he was released in the summer of 1957.

After leaving Chester, Hackett dropped into non-league football and played for Altrincham, Witton Albion, Macclesfield Town, Lockheed Leamington, Halesowen Town and Cradley Town while working in the building trade.

References

1933 births
Living people
People from Ramsbottom
English footballers
Association football forwards
English Football League players
Aston Villa F.C. players
Chester City F.C. players
Leamington F.C. players
Halesowen Town F.C. players
Cradley Town F.C. players
Footballers from Greater Manchester